Tracy Glacier may refer to the following glaciers:

 Tracy Glacier (Antarctica), in Wilkes Land, Antarctica
 Tracy Glacier (Greenland), in the Avannaata municipality of Greenland